Takayuki Matsumoto (born 10 January 1984) is a Japanese sport shooter. He won the bronze medal in the men's 50 metre rifle three positions event at the 2018 Asian Games held in Jakarta, Indonesia.

References

External links 
 

Living people
1984 births
Place of birth missing (living people)
Japanese male sport shooters
Asian Games medalists in shooting
Shooters at the 2006 Asian Games
Shooters at the 2014 Asian Games
Shooters at the 2018 Asian Games
Asian Games bronze medalists for Japan
Medalists at the 2014 Asian Games
Medalists at the 2018 Asian Games
Shooters at the 2020 Summer Olympics
Olympic shooters of Japan
21st-century Japanese people